The Devil's Own is a 1916 American silent drama film featuring Harry Carey.

Plot summary

Cast
 Harry Carey
 Olive Carey (as Olive Fuller Golden)
 Joe Rickson

See also
 List of American films of 1916
 Harry Carey filmography

References

External links
 

1916 films
American silent short films
American black-and-white films
Films directed by George Marshall
1916 drama films
1916 short films
Silent American drama films
1910s American films